Niels Drustrup (October 17, 1876 – March 15, 1957) was an officer in the United States Navy and a Medal of Honor recipient for his role in the United States occupation of Veracruz.

Biography
Niels Drustrup was born in Denmark, emigrated to the United States and enlisted the United States Navy on February 6, 1900.

In 1914 Drustrup was attached to the U.S.S. Utah as a chief turret captain.   On April 21 the Navy landed sailors and marines at Vera Cruz, Mexico to occupy the city.  Drustrup was later (in 1924) awarded the Medal of Honor for meritorious service under fire for several hours when he was in charge of an advanced barricade under a heavy fire. 
 
Drustrup was warranted to the rank of gunner on February 18, 1915, and received a temporary promotion to lieutenant on September 21, 1918.

He received a permanent promotion to lieutenant on August 3, 1920, and retired from the Navy on 6 February 1930.  

Lieutenant Drustrup died on March 15, 1957, and is buried in Arlington National Cemetery, Arlington, Virginia. His grave can be found in section 3, lot 4378-RH.

Awards
Medal of Honor
Good Conduct Medal
Mexican Service Medal
World War I Victory Medal

Medal of Honor citation
Rank and organization: Lieutenant, U.S. Navy. Born: 17 October 1876, Denmark. Accredited to: Pennsylvania. G.O. No.: 131, 17 July 1924.

Citation:

For meritorious service under fire on the occasion of landing of the naval forces at Vera Cruz, Mexico, on 21 April 1914. For several hours Lt. Drustrup was in charge of an advanced barricade under a heavy fire, and not only displayed utmost ability as a leader of men but also exerted a great steadying influence on the men around him. Lt. Drustrup was then attached to the U.S.S. Utah as a chief turret captain.

See also

 List of Medal of Honor recipients (Veracruz)

References

 

1876 births
1957 deaths
United States Navy Medal of Honor recipients
United States Navy officers
Burials at Arlington National Cemetery
Military personnel from Pennsylvania
American military personnel of the Spanish–American War
United States Navy personnel of World War I
Battle of Veracruz (1914) recipients of the Medal of Honor